is a train station in Toyoura, Abuta District, Hokkaidō, Japan.

Lines
Hokkaido Railway Company
Muroran Main Line Station H43

Adjacent stations

Railway stations in Hokkaido Prefecture
Railway stations in Japan opened in 1928